Kudashmanovo (Qoźaşman) is a rural locality (a village) in Ishlinsky Selsoviet, Beloretsky District, Bashkortostan, Russia. The population was 16 as of 2010. There is 1 street.

Geography 
Kudashmanovo is located 48 km west of Beloretsk (the district's administrative centre) by road. Ishlya is the nearest rural locality.

References 

Rural localities in Beloretsky District